Seven Mile is a census-designated place in Navajo County, in the U.S. state of Arizona, on the Fort Apache Indian Reservation. The population was 707 at the 2010 census.

Demographics

As of the census of 2010, there were 707 people, 166 households, and 147 families living in the CDP.

Transportation
The White Mountain Apache Tribe operates the Fort Apache Connection Transit, which provides local bus service.

References

Census-designated places in Navajo County, Arizona
White Mountain Apache Tribe